This page includes the discography of Mexican pop group RBD. RBD released six studio albums and twenty one official singles. The group's debut album, Rebelde, was released in 2004. Only 25,000 copies were initially distributed throughout Mexico, but the album's high demand caused an immediate increase. Rebelde obtained a Diamond certification in Mexico for the sales of half a million copies. Later, the album was certified Diamond + Gold in Mexico due to its high and continued sales. The first single released from the album was the title-track "Rebelde". The album's second single, "Solo Quédate en Silencio", reached a peak of #2 on the US Billboard Latin Pop Songs chart.

In July 2005, the group released their first live album, titled Tour Generación RBD En Vivo, and in September of the same year their second studio album, Nuestro Amor. Nuestro Amor managed to attain a Platinum certification in Mexico only 7 hours after being released and received a nomination at the 7th Annual Latin Grammy Awards for 'Best Pop Album by a Duo/Group with Vocals'. On April 4, 2006, RBD released their second live album, Live in Hollywood, which was recorded in the United States in Los Angeles, California. In November of the same year, the group released their third studio album, Celestial, which reached the #1 spot on both the US Billboard Top Latin Albums and Latin Pop Albums charts and produced the #1 single "Ser O Parecer". A month later, in December 2006, RBD released their first English-language album, Rebels, from which they promoted the single "Tu Amor", composed by famed songwriter Diane Warren.

In February 2007, the band then released their third live concert DVD, Live in Rio, which was filmed in Brazil at the Maracanã Stadium in front of 70,000 spectators. In March 2007, the group released their first soundtrack album, La Familia, and in October of that year their third live album and fourth live concert DVD, Hecho en España, shot in Madrid, Spain. In November 2007 came the release of RBD's fifth studio album, Empezar Desde Cero, which received a nomination for 'Best Pop Album By A Duo/Group With Vocals' at the 9th Annual Latin Grammy Awards.

2008 saw the release of the group's first official compilation album, Greatest Hits. In March 2009, RBD released Para Olvidarte de Mí, their last studio album. The farewell release debuted at #3 on the Billboard Latin Pop Albums chart and at #6 on the Billboard Top Latin Albums chart in the United States. March 2009 also saw the simultaneous release of RBD's fifth live DVD, Live in Brasília, which was shot in Brazil before a crowd of 500,000 people, the group's biggest audience of their career. That December, the group released their sixth and last concert DVD, Tournée do Adeus.

Albums
All regularly released albums and their peak chart positions in the US Billboard 200 (US), the US Billboard Top Latin Albums chart (US Latin), Mexico (MEX), Spain (SPA), the European Top 100 Albums chart (EU), Brazil (BRA) and Argentina (ARG).

Studio albums

Live albums

Video albums

Compilations albums

Soundtracks

EPs

Box sets

Certifications

Certification granted to both Rebelde and Rebelde (Edição Brasil).

Singles
A (—) indicates no chart position known.

All regularly released singles and their peak chart positions on the US Billboard Hot 100 (US Hot 100), US Billboard Hot Latin Songs (US HLS) and US Billboard Latin Pop Songs (US LPS).

Promotional singles
These are promotional or minor releases which may have charted in these categories.

Footnotes:
1 - Only released in Mexico.
2 - The song was released in Mexico as a radio only single (along with a music video) and even though it was a hit on the radio, the song did not manage to enter the Mexican Airplay Charts.
3 - RBD was chosen to interpret the official theme song for the Mexico national football team for the 2006 FIFA World Cup. The song was not released as an official single in the United States, though it was made available for digital download, and appeared on the compilation album of the same name.
4 - Even though both songs weren't released as official singles, both of them received major airplay throughout Mexico. The songs were played on radio stations, but did not managed to chart on the Mexican Airplay Charts.
5 - The song was used to promote the Mexican health-awareness campaign "Elige Estar Bien", and had an accompanying music video.

Promotional singles in Brazil
These are promotional releases and their peak chart positions in Brazil (BRA).

Other appearances

Music videos

References

Discography
Discographies of Mexican artists
Latin pop music discographies